Worthing High School may refer to:
Worthing High School, West Sussex - UK
Worthing High School (Houston, Texas)